DeJay Lester (born December 14, 1988) is an American football wide receiver who is currently a free agent. He played college football at Wyoming

College career
Lester began his college career at Snow College, as a defensive back and played a great deal as a true freshman on a National Champion-Runner Up team. Following his freshman season, he moved to wide receiver with the foreknowledge that he would need to redshirt based on the depth that was already in place at that position.
In 2009, DeJay was an outstanding player Snow College. He was a great leader at his position group and played with the attitude and toughness that any coach would desire. He was a full-time starter and a great player but maintained his humility and work ethic necessary to be great.
Lester's play at Snow lead him to earn a scholarship offer from the University of Wyoming.

Professional career

Green Bay Blizzard

Utah Blaze

Utah Stealth
Played 3 games for the Utah Stealth Semi-Pro team of the Rocky Mountain Football League. Finished third on team with 12-184-2 in receiving, 8-182 on kick returning, and 4-88-1 for punt returns. Had a 73-yard punt return for a td.

Bemidji Axemen
Lester signed with the Bemidji Axemen of the IFL for 2014. He only played in a single game for the Axemen on February 22. On February 24, 2014, Lester was released by the Axemen.

Iowa Barnstormers
On February 25, 2014, Lester was assigned to the Iowa Barnstormers. He was released by the Barnstormers on April 16, 2015.

New Orleans VooDoo
On April 15, 2015, Lester was assigned to the New Orleans VooDoo. He was placed on reassignment on April 30, 2015.

Tri-Cities Fever
On May 7, 2015, Lester was signed by the Tri-Cities Fever. On May 2, 2016, Lester was released.

Cedar Rapids Titans
On May 18, 2016, Lester signed with the Cedar Rapids Titans. On June 28, 2016, Lester was released.

Return to Iowa
On March 16, 2017, Lester signed with the Barnstormers.

References

Living people
1988 births
Wyoming Cowboys football players
Snow Badgers football players
Green Bay Blizzard players
Utah Blaze players
Bemidji Axemen players
Iowa Barnstormers players
New Orleans VooDoo players
Tri-Cities Fever players
Cedar Rapids River Kings players
Players of American football from Utah